Mahmoud Ghaed Rahmati (born 6 December 1991) is an Iranian footballer who plays as a defensive midfielder for Naft Masjed Soleyman in the Iran Pro League.

References

Gahar Zagros players
Sepahan S.C. footballers
Naft Masjed Soleyman F.C. players
Persian Gulf Pro League players
1991 births
Living people
Association football midfielders
Iranian footballers
People from Dorud